Tyrese Cooper (born March 21, 2000)  is a former American track and field athlete who competed in sprinting events, specializing in the 100 metres, 200 metres, and 400 metres. He attended Miami Norland Senior High School in Miami Gardens, Florida.

In August 2016, Cooper ran new personal bests in the 100 metres, 200 metres, and 400 metres events. His 400 metres time of 45.23 seconds came within .09 seconds of Obea Moore's World Youth Best and surpassed Kirani James for the fifth-fastest by a Youth (under 18) athlete ever.

On April 30, 2018, Cooper was arrested for attempted grand theft auto. He was charged with multiple felonies, all of which were eventually dropped.

In April 2018, Cooper was offered a football scholarship by the Florida State Seminoles.

In February 2021 Cooper was arrested and charged with armed robbery following the theft of $19,000 worth of cell phones and merchandise from a Mobile One store in Miami. According to reports, Cooper brandished a firearm during the robbery before breaking open a glass case full of merchandise. Cooper cut his hand doing so, and later sought medical treatment for the wound; this helped lead to his arrest. 

On Jan 6 2022 Cooper was sentenced to 84 months in prison for his role in the robbery.

Personal bests

References

External links 
 Tyrese Cooper at OmRiyadat
 

2000 births
Living people
American male middle-distance runners
Place of birth missing (living people)
21st-century American people